Hermione Cobbold, Baroness Cobbold (born Margaret Hermione Millicent Bulwer-Lytton; 31 August 1905 – 27 October 2004), known as Lady Hermione Bulwer-Lytton until 1930, was the British matriarch of Knebworth House and wife of Cameron Fromanteel Cobbold, 1st Baron Cobbold.

Born in 1905 to Victor Bulwer-Lytton, 2nd Earl of Lytton and Pamela Frances Audrey Chichele-Plowden, during her father's tenure as acting Viceroy of India she became Vicereine, her mother who would have held that role, being in England.

It was while she was in India that she met and married (in 1930), to Cameron Fromanteel Cobbold, future Baron Cobbold. She inherited Knebworth House following the death of her father in 1947; both her brothers predeceased their father. Hermione Cobbold was an energetic supporter of many charities and local organizations such as the YMCA. She died in Hertfordshire at the age of 99, survived by her daughter and two sons. Her elder daughter had died in 1937.

References

Sources

1905 births
2004 deaths
British baronesses
Daughters of British earls
Place of birth missing
Place of death missing
Hermione
British people in colonial India
Wives of knights